Terry Lee Clark (born October 18, 1960) is an American former Major League Baseball player. Clark notched 10 victories as a pitcher and on August 18, 1995, picked up his only MLB save against the Athletics.

From 2000 to 2004, Clark was a pitching coach in the Cleveland Indians minor league system for Single-A Mahoning Valley, Double-A Akron, and Triple-A Buffalo. From 2006 to 2008, he was the pitching coach for Double-A Frisco in the Rangers organization. On December 29, 2008, he was named the pitching coach for Triple-A Oklahoma City. He was also the Seattle Mariners' Minor League pitching coordinator 2014–2015, then in 2016 hired as the Chicago Cubs pitching coach at Tennessee.

His son, Matt Clark, is also a professional baseball player.

References

External links

The Baseball Gauge
Venezuela Winter League

1960 births
Living people
American expatriate baseball players in Canada
Arkansas Travelers players
Atlanta Braves players
Baltimore Orioles players
Baseball players from Los Angeles
Buffalo Bisons (minor league) players
California Angels players
Cleveland Indians players
Colorado Springs Sky Sox players
Edmonton Trappers players
Gastonia Cardinals players
Houston Astros players
Johnson City Cardinals players
Kansas City Royals players
Leones del Caracas players
American expatriate baseball players in Venezuela
Louisville Redbirds players
Major League Baseball pitchers
Midland Angels players
Minor league baseball coaches
Mt. SAC Mounties baseball players
Oklahoma RedHawks players
Omaha Royals players
Rancho Cucamonga Quakes players
Richmond Braves players
Rochester Red Wings players
St. Petersburg Cardinals players
Texas Rangers players
Tucson Toros players
Vancouver Canadians players
Wichita Wranglers players